Karl Georg Friedrich Rudolf Leuckart (7 October 1822 – 22 February 1898) was a German zoologist born in Helmstedt. He was a nephew to naturalist Friedrich Sigismund Leuckart (1794–1843).

Academic career 
He earned his degree from the University of Göttingen, where he was a student of Rudolf Wagner (1805–1864). Afterwards he participated on a scientific expedition to the North Sea for the study marine invertebrates. Later he became a professor of zoology at the University of Giessen (1850) and the University of Leipzig (1869).

Parasitological research 
Leuckart is remembered for his work in parasitology, particularly research regarding tapeworm and trichinosis. He was the first to prove that Taenia saginata occurs only in cattle (and humans), and Taenia solium occurs only in swine (and humans). His study of Trichina helped support Rudolf Virchow's campaign to create meat inspection laws in Germany. With Virchow and Friedrich Albert von Zenker (1825–1898), he was the first to document the life cycle of the parasite Trichinella spiralis in swine and humans.

He, and independently Algernon Thomas, experimentally discovered the life-cycle of the sheep liver fluke in 1881–1883.

Today the "Rudolf-Leuckart-Medaille" is an annual award given for research in parasitology by the Deutschen Gesellschaft für Parasitologie (German Society of Parasitology).

Other contributions 
Leuckart is credited with splitting George Cuvier's Radiata into two phyla: Coelenterata and Echinodermata.  As a scientist, his provided excellent descriptions of morphologic details giving credence to the idea that zoological evolution can be learned through its anatomical changes. Between 1877 and 1892, he developed a series of zoological wall charts that have been used worldwide as teaching aids.

In the field of entomology, he conducted investigations into the micropyle and fertilization of insect eggs, the reproduction and development involving members of Pupipara, parthenogenesis among insects, and studies on the anatomy and life history of the honeybee.

A quote attributed to Rudolf Leuckart:

A species of Australian lizard, Anomalopus leuckarti, is named in his honor.

Family
Leuckart's son, Carl Louis Rudolf Leuckart (1854–1889), was a chemist and professor.

Written works 
  Beiträge zur Kenntnis wirbelloser Tiere, (Contributions to the knowledge of invertebrate animals) with Heinrich Frey; Braunschweig, 1847.
 Über die Morphologie und Verwandtschaftsverhältnisse der wirbellosen Tiere, (On the morphology and relationships of invertebrate animals) Braunschweig, 1848
 Zur Morphologie und Anatomie der Geschlechtsorgane, (Morphology and anatomy of reproductive organs) Braunschweig, 1848.
 Beiträge zur Lehre der Befruchtung, (Contributions to the theory of fertilization) Göttinger Nachrichten, 1849.
 Über den Polymorphismus der Individuen oder die Erscheinungen der Arbeitsteilung in der Natur, (On polymorphism of individuals or the phenomena of division of labor in nature), Gießen, 1851.
 Zoologische Untersuchungen, (Zoological research) Gießen, 1853–54, 3 Hefte.
 Vergleichende Anatomie und Physiologie, (Comparative Anatomy and Physiology) Leuckart & Bergmann, Stuttgart, 1852.
 Die Fortpflanzung und Entwicklung der Pupiparen, (The reproduction and development of Pupipara) Halle, 1857.
 Zur Kenntnis des Generationswechsels und der Parthenogenesis bei den Insekten, (Change in generations and parthenogenesis in insects) Frankfurt, 1858.
 Untersuchungen über Trichina spiralis, (Studies on Trichina spiralis) Leipzig, 1860, second edition- 1866.
 Die Blasenwürmer und ihre Entwicklung, (Bladder-worms and their development) Gießen, 1856.
 Die Parasiten des Menschen und die von ihnen herrührenden Krankheiten, (Parasites of man and the diseases arising from them), Leipzig, 1863–76, 2 volumes; second edition- 1879 ff.
 Die Entwicklunggeschichte des Leberegels (Distonum hepaticum, dt.), (Developmental history of the liver fluke (Distonum hepatic dt.) in: Zoologischer Anzeiger 4, 1881.
 Neue Beiträge zur Kenntnis des Baes und der Lebensgeschichte der Nematoden, (New contributions to the knowledge of Baes and the life history of nematodes, 1887.

References

External links 

 Leuckart Wall Charts
 The Animal Parasites of Man by Harold Benjamin Fantham and Maximilian Gustav Braun
 List of published works copied from the German Wikipedia.
 Rudolf Leuckart (1848) Ueber die Morphologie und die Verwandtschaftsverhältnisse der wirbellosen Thiere – digital facsimile from the Linda Hall Library

1822 births
1898 deaths
People from Helmstedt
People from the Duchy of Brunswick
19th-century German zoologists
Academic staff of Leipzig University
Foreign Members of the Royal Society
Foreign associates of the National Academy of Sciences
Recipients of the Pour le Mérite (civil class)
Members of the Royal Society of Sciences in Uppsala